Jacques Du Frische (1640–1693) was a French Benedictine theologian.

1640 births
1693 deaths
Benedictine monks
17th-century French Catholic theologians